{{DISPLAYTITLE:C14H19N3O}}
The molecular formula C14H19N3O (molar mass: 245.320 g/mol, exact mass: 245.1528 u) may refer to:

 Methafurylene, an antihistamine
 Oxolamine, a cough suppressant

Molecular formulas